Space Invaders is an arcade video game designed by Tomohiro Nishikado in 1978.

Space Invaders may also refer to:

Games
 Space Invaders Extreme, a 2008 remake of the original arcade game for the Nintendo DS
 Space Invaders Get Even, a 2008 spin-off of the original arcade game for the Wii
 Space Invaders: Invasion Day, a 2003 video game developed by Taito

Music
 "Space Invaders" (Hit'n'Hide song)
 "Space Invaders" (Player One song)
 "Space Invaders", a 1980 instrumental by the English-American rock band Pretenders on the 1980 album Pretenders
 Space Invader (album), a 2014 album by former Kiss guitarist Ace Frehley

Media
 Space Invaders, a 2020 Australian lifestyle television series
 Spaced Invaders, a 1990 science fiction comedy by Patrick Read Johnson
 "Space Invaders", a three episode story arc in the 2003 Teenage Mutant Ninja Turtles TV series

Science
 Space Invaders (biology): a set of DNA transposon families described by Pace et al in 2008

See also
 Invaders from Space, a 1964 film
 Invader (disambiguation)
 Alien invasion (disambiguation)
 Invader (artist) (born 1969), a French urban artist whose namesake is the 1978 arcade game